The 2022 Porsche Carrera Cup Germany was the 37th season of the Porsche Carrera Cup Germany. The season began at Spa-Francorchamps on 5 May and ended at Hockenheim on 23 October. Races were held in Belgium, Germany, Austria, Italy and the Netherlands.

Calendar

Entry List

Results

Standings

Overall

Rookie

ProAm

Team

See also 

 2022 Porsche Supercup

Notes

References

External links 

 Official Website

Porsche Carrera Cup Germany seasons
Porsche Carrera Cup Germany